Tungsten(II) chloride is the inorganic compound with the formula W6Cl12.  It is a polymeric cluster compound.  The material dissolves in concentrated hydrochloric acid, forming (H3O)2[W6Cl14](H2O)x. Heating this salt gives yellow-brown W6Cl12.  The structural chemistry resembles that observed for molybdenum(II) chloride.

Tungsten(II) chloride is prepared by reduction of the hexachloride.  Bismuth is a typical reductant:
6 WCl6  +  8 Bi  →   W6Cl12  +  8 BiCl3
.

References

Tungsten halides
Chlorides
Octahedral compounds